Sagoni Khurd is a village in the Bhopal district of Madhya Pradesh, India. It is located in the Berasia tehsil.

Demographics 

Most of the village's population now lives in Sagoni Kalan. According to the 2011 census of India, Sagoni Khurd has only 1 household. The effective literacy rate (i.e. the literacy rate of population excluding children aged 6 and below) is 50%.

References 

Villages in Berasia tehsil